The People's Liberation Party (abbreviated PLP) is a political party in East Timor. The party is led by former East Timorese president Taur Matan Ruak, who became the PLP's leader in 2017.

History 
On 9 December 2015, the PLP submitted 35,000 signatures from its supporters to the East Timorese Supreme Court, to be officially recognized as a political party. On 22 December 2015, the Supreme Court accepted their request and officially recognized the party. In 2015, it was reported that then East Timorese president Taur Matan Ruak planned on becoming the leader of the PLP after he finished his term in office. In 2017, Taur Matan Ruak became the PLP's leader, replacing Adérito de Jesus Soares.

Election results

Legislative elections

References 

Political parties in East Timor
2015 establishments in East Timor
Political parties established in 2015